Shit Kicker or Shitkicker may refer to:

 A pejorative and slang insult; see 
 Combat boots, military boots designed for soldiers
 Cowboy boots, riding boots historically worn by cowboys
 Wellington boots, waterproof, almost knee-high boots made from rubber or PVC
 those who wear the footwear listed above: Cowboys or cowgirls and by extension rednecks in general